Duncan Thaane Lechesa (born 26 July 1976) is a retired South African football player who is currently the head coach of National First Division team F.C. Cape Town.

Career
In a 15-year career, Lechesa played as a central midfielder for Bloemfontein Celtic, Ajax Cape Town, Black Leopards and Free State Stars before retiring in 2010. Born in Bloemfontein, Free State, Lechesa began playing football with Bloemfontein Celtic's youth sides before signing with National First Division club Bloemfontein Young Tigers. He started 24 league matches during his final season with Stars, winning the club's player of the season award.

After he retired from playing, Lechesa became a football coach. He was appointed manager of Carara Kicks in 2010. He had a brief stint with United FC in 2011, but returned to Carara Kicks. Lechesa joined Polokwane City in January 2013, and led them to promotion to the Premier Soccer League within six months. He parted ways with Polokwane City on 16 September 2013 after the club had lost their opening 4 games of the 2013–14 Premier Soccer League season. Lechesa was appointed the head coach of F.C. Cape Town on 22 October 2013, but resigned in March 2014

References

1976 births
Living people
South African soccer players
Sportspeople from Bloemfontein
Bloemfontein Celtic F.C. players
Cape Town Spurs F.C. players
Black Leopards F.C. players
Free State Stars F.C. players
Association football midfielders
Polokwane City F.C. managers
South African soccer managers
Soccer players from the Free State (province)